The King Center or the Maxwell C. King Center for the Performing Arts is a performing arts venue located at 3865 North Wickham Road, Melbourne, Florida. The main theater of the  facility contains 2,016 seats. There is also a 250-seat venue named the Studio Theatre or the Black Box in the facility.

History
The Florida Legislature approved funds for initial design work in 1983 and construction between 1985-86 for the $12.3 million facility. On April 10, 1988, the venue opened under the name Brevard Performing Arts Center with two sold out performances of Singin' in the Rain.  The next year, the named changed to Maxwell C. King Center for the Performing Arts.

Performances

The King Center presents more than 115 shows annually.

Operations
The center employs 10 full-time and 57 part-time employees. There are 400 volunteers.

Finances
Endowment was $3.5 million in 2009.

In 2009, it needed $2 million in repairs. It lost $911,000 in 2008. Management estimated that they would lose $700,000 in 2009.

Notes

Gallery

External links

Buildings and structures in Melbourne, Florida
Eastern Florida State College
Performing arts centers in Florida
Tourist attractions in Brevard County, Florida
Theatres completed in 1988
1988 establishments in Florida